Sapium is a genus of flowering plants in the family Euphorbiaceae. It is widespread across most of Latin America and the West Indies. Many Old World species were formerly included in the genus, but recent authors have redistributed all the Old World species into other genera.

Species are known commonly as milktrees.

Description
These are shrubs and trees. They produce latex. The leaves are alternately arranged and smooth-edged or toothed. They are monoecious, often with spikelike or raceme-shaped inflorescences that have several male flowers, plus a few female flowers near the base. The male flowers have 2 to 4 stamens. The female flowers have 2 to 4 styles which are sometimes coiled. The flowers lack petals. The fruit has 2 to 4 lobes and may split open or not.

Species

Toxicity
The milky sap of Sapium biloculare is poisonous if it comes into contact with the eyes, mucus membranes, stomach or bloodstream. It was used in arrow poison and to stupefy fish.

References

Hippomaneae
Euphorbiaceae genera
Taxa named by Nikolaus Joseph von Jacquin